Tetiana Anatoliyivna Donets (born 11 July 1980) is a Ukrainian politician who served as a People's Deputy of Ukraine in the seventh and eighth convocation.

Early life and education
Donets was born on 11 July 1980 in Dnepropetrovsk, the daughter of Natalia Donets. In 1998, she worked as an assistant deputy and a member of the temporary investigative commission of the Verkhovna Rada on ensuring electoral rights. She studied at the National Taras Shevchenko University of Kyiv, where she graduated in law in 2003. From 2004 to 2005, she was the director of the Astoria Hotel in Dnepropetrovsk. In 2005, she completed her studies in foreign economics at the Kiev Institute for International Relations.

Political career
From 2006 to 2010, Donets was a member of the political alliance BYuT in the district parliament of Shevchenkivskyi District, where she worked as chairman of the commission for local self-government and information policy. At that time, she was also the deputy leader of the BYuT faction in Shevchenkivskyi District.

In the 2012 parliamentary election, Donets was ranked 55 of the All-Ukrainian Union "Fatherland" party and was elected as a deputy to the Verkhovna Rada, where she was a member of the parliamentary committee on health policy. In the 2014 parliamentary election, Donets was number 20 on the People's Front list and was re-elected as a deputy in the eighth convocation.

Personal life
On 26 January 2018, Donets gave birth to a daughter.

References

1980 births
Living people
Politicians from Dnipro
Taras Shevchenko National University of Kyiv, Institute of International Relations alumni
Seventh convocation members of the Verkhovna Rada
Eighth convocation members of the Verkhovna Rada
21st-century Ukrainian women politicians
Women members of the Verkhovna Rada